"All Summer in a Day" is a science fiction short story by American writer Ray Bradbury, first published in the March 1954 issue of The Magazine of Fantasy & Science Fiction.

Plot synopsis 
The story is about a class of students on Venus, which, in this story, is a world of constant rainstorms, where the Sun is only visible for one hour every seven years.

One of the children, Margot, moved to Venus from Earth five years earlier, and she is the only one who remembers sunshine, since the sun shines regularly on Earth. 
When the teacher asks them to write a poem about the sun, hers is:  
 
 "I think the sun is a flower,
 That blooms for just one hour".

She describes the Sun as "penny", or "like fire in the stove". The other children, being too young ever to have seen it themselves, do not believe her. Led by a boy named William, they bully and antagonize her, and just before the sun comes out, William rallies the other children, and they lock her in a closet down a tunnel.

As the sun is about to appear, their teacher arrives to take the class outside to enjoy their hour of sunshine and, in their astonishment and joy, they all forget about Margot. They run, play, skip, jump, and prance about, savoring every second of their newfound freedom. "Oh, it's better than the sunlamps, isn't it?" 

Suddenly, a girl catches a raindrop in her hands. A kid starts crying because of it, realizing that they won't get to see the sun again for another seven years. Thunder sounds, then the lightning comes, and the children run back inside as the sun disappears and it starts to pour again. At this point, one of them remembers Margot, who is still locked in the closet. Ashamed, they let her out of the closet, standing frozen, embarrassed over what they have done and unable to "meet each other's glances".

The precious sun has come and gone, and because of their jealousy, Margot, who loved the sun the most, has missed out.

Adaptations
A 30-minute television adaptation was created, originally broadcast on the PBS' children's series WonderWorks in 1982. The ending is expanded to show the children atoning for their horrible act by giving Margot flowers that they picked while the Sun was out. The director of photography was Robert Elswit, who went on to become an Academy Award winning cinematographer. A very notable difference is that in this version, the sun only appears every nine years.

Short film cast
 Reesa Mallen as Margot
 Keith Coogan as William
 Tammy Simpson
 Bridget Meade as Lisa
 Edith Fields as Mrs. Callaghan

Analysis 
The story has been discussed in the context of magic realism, as a metaphor for the importance of Earth and difficulty in surviving outside of the human natural environment.

See also
 Venus in fiction
 The Long Rain

References

External links
 

1954 short stories
Short stories by Ray Bradbury
Short stories set on Venus
Works originally published in The Magazine of Fantasy & Science Fiction
Science fiction short stories
Short stories adapted into films